Stealth is a 2005 American military science fiction action film directed by Rob Cohen and written by W. D. Richter, and starring Josh Lucas, Jessica Biel, Jamie Foxx, Sam Shepard, Joe Morton and Richard Roxburgh. The film follows three top fighter pilots as they join a project to develop an automated robotic stealth aircraft.

Released on July 29, 2005, by Columbia Pictures, the film was a box office failure, grossing $79 million worldwide against a budget of $135 million. It was one of the worst losses in cinematic history.

Plot
In the near future, the U.S. Navy develops the F/A-37 Talon, a single-seat fighter-bomber with advanced payload, range, speed, and stealth capabilities. The program recruits three pilots out of many applicants, them being Lieutenants Ben Gannon, Kara Wade, and Henry Purcell. Captain George Cummings is the overall head.

Cummings hires Dr. Keith Orbit to develop an artificial intelligence, the "Extreme Deep Invader" (EDI) to control an uncrewed jet that further advances the program. This sparks controversy over a machine's inability to make moral decisions versus humans' struggle to overcome ego.

The team is training EDI in air combat maneuvers when it is unexpectedly reassigned to kill the heads of three terrorist cells at a conference in downtown Rangoon. EDI calculates that mission success can be achieved only through a vertical strike, which could cause a human pilot to black out. Command orders EDI to attack but Gannon ignores the order, successfully carrying out the strike himself.

As the team returns to the Lincoln, EDI is hit by lightning, which reprograms its neural patterns. Though EDI is discovered to be learning exponentially, developing a rudimentary ethical code and an ego, Cummings refuses to take it offline. During a mission to destroy stolen nuclear warheads in Tajikistan, Wade realizes that the nuclear debris will cause significant collateral damage.  The human pilots abort, but EDI defies orders and destroys the warheads, causing extensive radioactive fallout and civilian casualties as anticipated.

Cummings orders the unit return to base but EDI refuses. Gannon orders that EDI be shot down. In the ensuing dogfight, Purcell crashes when a missile he fires at EDI explodes on a mountain, blinding him. Wade's plane is damaged by debris from the same explosion, which triggers her plane's auto-destruct, forcing her to eject over North Korea. Gannon must alone stop EDI from executing a twenty-year-old war scenario called "Caviar Sweep" that requires attacking Russia.

Gannon chases EDI into Russian territory where they defeat several Russian Su-37s over Lake Baikal. Both planes are damaged so Gannon calls a truce with EDI in order to keep both of them from falling into enemy hands and to be able to rescue Wade from North Korea. Cummings instructs Gannon to make an emergency landing with EDI in Alaska. Accountable for ignoring EDI's behavior and facing court-martial, Cummings seeks to eliminate witnesses by leaving Wade stranded in North Koreawhere she is being pursued by the Korean People's Army as she heads to the Korean Demilitarized Zoneand by ordering Gannon eliminated in Alaska, where EDI's data will also be erased.

Gannon's Talon crash lands at the Alaska base. Suspecting Cummings' treachery, he narrowly escapes an assassination attempt by a doctor, who tries to inject him with a supposed tetanus serum. As the pair struggle, the doctor is injected with the substance and dies. Meanwhile, when Orbit places EDI into an interface, the AI expresses regret for its transgressions. Orbit realizes that EDI has developed sentience, and he is unwilling to erase EDI's memory. Gannon uses EDI's weapons systems to decimate the armed personnel, allowing Orbit to safely flee, then flies off to North Korea in EDI's plane, contacting the Lincoln skipper, Captain Dick Marshfield, to inform him about Cummings' deceit. Marshfield confronts Cummings, who dies of suicide while leaving a voicemail message to his financial contact, Ray.

Gannon finds the injured and embattled Wade nearing the border. He and EDI land and he runs to her aid. Out of ammunition and taking damage from a Mi-8 helicopter, EDI sacrifices itself by ramming the helicopter, destroying both. This allows Gannon and Wade to cross on foot into South Korea, where they are rescued.

After attending Purcell's funeral, Gannon awkwardly expresses his feelings of love to Wade.

In a post-credits scene, in the debris-strewn border between North and South Korea, EDI's "brain" is seen turning back on.

Cast

 Josh Lucas as Lt. Ben Gannon, US Navy pilot part of the F/A-37 program
 Jessica Biel as Kara Wade, 2nd US Navy pilot part of the F/A-37 program
 Jamie Foxx as Henry Purcell, 3rd US Navy pilot part of the F/A-37 program
 Sam Shepard as Capt. George Cummings, leader and founder of the F/A-37 program
 Joe Morton as Capt. Dick Marshfield, captain of the USS Abraham Lincoln
 Ebon Moss-Bachrach as Tim
 Richard Roxburgh as Dr. Keith Orbit, the creator of EDI
 David Andrews as Ray, financial contact of George Cummings
 Wentworth Miller as voice of EDI, an uncrewed, AI jet

Production

In August 2002, it was announced Columbia Pictures has picked up Warrior a W.D. Richter spec script set up at Phoenix Pictures about a high- tech air force fighter drone that malfunctions, wiping out the better part of an crewed elite squadron. Vastly overmatched, a single pilot must attempt to destroy the drone. In November of that year Rob Cohen entered negotiations to direct.

Stealth features several shots of action on aircraft carriers.

The film was shot in Thailand, Australia (Blue Mountains National Park in New South Wales and Flinders Ranges in South Australia), and New Zealand. Cohen cited Macross as an inspiration for the film.

Featured technologies
Stealth featured many presently used, futuristic, or theoretical technologies at the time of release.  These include:
 Computer technology (all wildly mixed)
 quantum computer
 Artificial neural network
 artificial intelligence
 Airplanes
 pulse detonation engine
 scramjet
 VTOL
 aeroelastic control surfaces
 EDI UCAV (Extreme Deep Invader UCAV) 
 Sukhoi Su-37 Terminator. The aircraft featured in the film are shown as having two crew members, although the current prototype Su-37 is a single-seat aircraft.  , however, there are only two prototype Su-37 aircraft in existence, never having been bought as a production aircraft.
 The fictional F/A-37 Talon. The aircraft mock ups for the Talon were so realistic that photos of them on the deck of an aircraft carrier were circulated online, claiming they displayed an actual experimental aircraft. The aircraft itself has a similar configuration to the unbuilt Northrop Switchblade.
 Boeing F/A-18E/F Super Hornet
 F/A-18 Hornet
 High-altitude airships (Camelhumps) used for aerial refueling
 Warships
 The aircraft supercarrier featured in the film, USS Abraham Lincoln, is shown to have three different Naval Registry numbers during angles from different scenes. This is due to filming of the USS Nimitz and USS Carl Vinson being incorporated into the final movie.

Litigation
In March 2005, Leo Stoller, who claimed to own trademark rights to the word "stealth", served Columbia Pictures with a "cease and desist" letter threatening litigation if they did not rename the film to something "non infringing".  Columbia preemptively sued Stoller, and the court entered a consent judgment and permanent injunction in favor of Columbia Pictures and against Stoller in November 2005.

The Environmental Defender's Office, a community legal centre specialising in environmental law, successfully represented the Blue Mountains Conservation Society Inc. in its attempts to prevent filming of Stealth in the Grose Wilderness area of the Blue Mountains National Park, NSW, Australia, in May 2004. Justice Lloyd of the New South Wales Land and Environment Court ruled that the proposed commercial filming of scenes in the area was unlawful, in a significant statement on the value of wilderness areas and the protection that should be afforded to them.  The Society claimed that the authority and consent for the commercial filming activities were in breach of the National Parks and Wildlife Act 1974 and the Wilderness Act 1987. Justice Lloyd accepted the Society's arguments that the proposed commercial filming in a wilderness area was completely against the intended use of the land, concluding his judgment with the words, "wilderness is sacrosanct".

Soundtrack

The soundtrack was released on 12 July 2005 on Epic Records. American rock band Incubus wrote and recorded three new songs for the film. According to guitarist Mike Einziger, Cohen was a big fan and "wouldn't stop asking." It was the first time the band had composed original music for a soundtrack, with frontman Brandon Boyd citing "Princes of the Universe" by Queen as an inspiration for writing music for a film. "Neither of Us Can See" is also notable for being Incubus' first duet, featuring vocals from Chrissie Hynde. The song is featured in the end credits.

Release

Box office
The film cost $135 million to produce (excluding advertising costs) and was released in  3,495 theaters, but had an opening weekend of only $13.3 million for an average of only $3,792 per theater, peaking at 4th place behind Wedding Crashers, Charlie and the Chocolate Factory and Sky High. It then lost 55% of its audience in its second weekend dropping to 7th place to $5.9 million, while remaining at 3,495 theaters and averaging just $1,695 per theater. In its third weekend, it lost 1,455 theaters, and a further 64 percent of its audience, dropping to 11th, with just $2.2 million, for an average of just $1,055 from 2,040 theaters.

It ended up making $32.1 million in the United States and Canada, and $47.2 million internationally, for a total worldwide gross of $79.3 million, making it the biggest money loser in a series of financial disasters released by Columbia Pictures in 2005 next to XXX: State of the Union, Bewitched, Rent, Zathura, Into the Blue, Man of the House and Lords of Dogtown.

Critical response

On Rotten Tomatoes, the film has an approval rating of 12% based on 141 reviews, with an average rating of 3.74/10. The site's critical consensus reads, "Loud, preposterous, and predictable, Stealth borrows heavily and unsuccessfully from Top Gun and 2001." On Metacritic, the film has a weighted average score of 35 out of 100, based on 31 critics,  indicating "generally unfavorable reviews". Audiences surveyed by CinemaScore gave the film a grade "B−" on scale of A to F.

Roger Ebert commented that the film was "a dumbed-down Top Gun crossed with the HAL 9000 plot from 2001."

Later director Rob Cohen unfavorably compared Stealth to his two previous box-office hits, The Fast and Furious and XxX: “Fast And Furious can be what it is as a story, but in the end, it was a fun Summer ride; XxX was a fun Summer ride… And Stealth was not fun. It was not as entertaining moment-to-moment as the other two had been, and what I think you need for a movie in the Summer.“

Home media 

The film was released on VHS and DVD on November 15, 2005.

See also
 Intelligent Fly-by-Wire

References

External links

 
 
 
 
 
 Maritimequest Filming Stealth photo gallery
 

Australian aviation films
Australian science fiction action films
2005 films
2005 science fiction action films
American aviation films
American science fiction action films
New Zealand science fiction action films
English-language Tajikistani films
Films directed by Rob Cohen
Films produced by Neal H. Moritz
Films scored by BT (musician)
Films set in the future
Films set in Alaska
Films set in Myanmar
Films set in Nevada
Films set in North Korea
Films set in Russia
Films set in South Korea
Films set in Seattle
Films set in Thailand
Films set in the Pacific Ocean
Films set in Washington, D.C.
Films shot in California
Films shot in China
Films shot in New Zealand
Films shot in Thailand
Films shot in Flinders Ranges
Films about the United States Navy
Columbia Pictures films
Films with screenplays by W. D. Richter
American women aviators
Phoenix Pictures films
Original Film films
Films about artificial intelligence
Drone films
Films about nuclear war and weapons
Military science fiction films
Techno-thriller films
Films set on aircraft carriers
Films about terrorism in Asia
Films set in Tajikistan
Films set in Siberia
Films about the Korean People's Army
Films shot in New South Wales
Films shot in South Australia
2000s English-language films
2000s American films